Barner is a surname. Notable people with the surname include:

 Ann Barner (born 1950), English swimmer
 Joachim Hartvig Johan von Barner (1699–1768), Danish-German military officer
 Kenjon Barner (born 1989), American football player
 Kenneth Barner, American engineer
 Martin Barner (1921–2020), German mathematician
 Regitze Barner (1834–1911), Danish noblewoman

See also
 Barner (noble family), Danish noble family
 Barner Stücker See, lake in Mecklenburg-Vorpommern, Germany
 Barnor, surname
 Mads Barner-Christensen (born 1965), a Danish author
 Uri Bar-Ner, a senior adviser to the President of the America-Israel Friendship League